Milker's nodules are a cutaneous condition that is most commonly transmitted from the udders of infected cows. Milker's nodule is caused by Paravaccinia virus. The disease in humans is nearly identical to Orf.


Pathogen 
Milker's nodules is a zoonotic dermatosis. It was caused by double-stranded DNA virus of the Parapoxvirus genus. Parapoxvirus usually presents in the saliva, nasal secretions, and in lesions over the udder, trunk, and limbs of affected bovine cattle. It may transmitted by direct or indirect contact of lesion.

See also 
 Farmyard pox
 List of cutaneous conditions

References 

Virus-related cutaneous conditions